Richard Lionel Clarke (born 25 June 1949) is a retired Irish Anglican bishop and author. From 2012 to 2020, he served as the Archbishop of Armagh and Primate of All Ireland: as such, he was the senior cleric of the Church of Ireland.

Early life and education
Clarke was born on 25 June 1949 in Dublin, Ireland. He was educated at Drumcondra National School and at Wesley College, a fee-paying independent school in Dublin. He attended Trinity College, Dublin (M.A., Ph.D.) and King's College London (B.D.) where he studied history and theology.

Ordained ministry
Clarke was ordained a deacon in 1975 and priest in 1976, serving as a curate in Holywood, County Down for two years from 1975–77 and again as a curate at St Bartholomew's with Christ Church, Leeson Park, Dublin from 1977–79, before serving as Dean of Residence at Trinity College, Dublin for five years. Clarke travelled thence to Bandon, County Cork, where he served as rector until 1993 when he was appointed Dean of Cork.

Episcopal ministry
Clarke was elected and consecrated to the bishopric of Meath and Kildare in 1996.

In 2012, he was elected, in succession to Alan Harper, to be the Archbishop of Armagh and Primate of All Ireland. His translation to Armagh took effect on 15 December 2012, on which date he also was enthroned at St Patrick's Cathedral.

On 2 November 2019, during his presidential address to Armagh Diocesan Synod, Clarke announced that he would retire on 2 February 2020. The Archbishop of Dublin, the Most Reverend Dr Michael Jackson, paid tribute to Clarke after the announcement, saying, "Archbishop Clarke has dedicated his life to the service of God and the church."

Personal life
Clarke married Linda Margaret Thompson in 1975: she died in 2009. He has two children and three grandchildren, as of 2017.

Selected works
Clarke is the author of And Is It True? (2000), The Unharmonious Blacksmith (2002), A Whisper of God (2006), and Shouldering the Lamb: Reflections on an Icon (2017).

References

1949 births
Living people
Alumni of Trinity College Dublin
Alumni of the Theological Department of King's College London
Anglican archbishops of Armagh
Bishops of Meath and Kildare
Deans of Cork
20th-century Anglican bishops in Ireland
21st-century Anglican bishops in Ireland
21st-century Anglican archbishops
People educated at Wesley College, Dublin
Irish Anglican archbishops